Malnaș River may refer to:

 Malnaș, a tributary of the Olt in Covasna County
 Malnaș, a tributary of the Pârâul Vinului in Harghita County

See also 
 Malnaș